Adolf Fischer may refer to:

 Adolf Fischer (actor) (1900–1984), German actor
 Adolf Fischer (officer) (1893–1947), Generalmajor in the Wehrmacht 
 Adolph Fischer (1858–1887), labor activist